Agnes of Holstein-Kiel (d. 1287) was a lady consort of Rostock by marriage to Waldemar, Lord of Rostock. 

She was regent of Rostock during the minority of her son Nicholas I, Lord of Rostock between 1282 and 1284.

She was daughter of Count John I of Kiel.

Issue
She had the following issue:
 Henry Borwin IV (d. before 1285)
 John (d. before 1285)
 Nicholas I (before 1262 – 1314), Lord of Rostock from 1282 to 1312.

References

13th-century women rulers
13th-century German women
1287 deaths
Lords of Rostock
13th-century German nobility